All the Sad Young Men is a 1962 album by Anita O'Day, arranged by Gary McFarland and produced by Creed Taylor.

Reception

Richard S. Ginell reviewed the reissue of the album for Allmusic and wrote that on the album O'Day was "served with a collection of brilliant, difficult big-band charts, courtesy of a 27-year-old emerging master named Gary McFarland who mixed instrumental voices and tempo changes in querulous, turbulent combinations" and highlighted "You Came a Long Way From St. Louis" as being "enlivened with sprouting shafts of outlaw muted brass and reeds". Ginell wrote that it was "...a tribute to O'Day's abilities that she makes it all sound easy, exhibiting a freedom in phrasing and improvising that is extraordinary even for her".

Track listing 
 "Boogie Blues" (Remo Biondi, Gene Krupa) – 3:44
 "You Came a Long Way from St. Louis" (John Benson Brooks, Bob Russell) – 4:12
 "I Want to Sing a Song" (Margo Guryan, Gary McFarland) – 2:42
 "A Woman Alone with the Blues" (Willard Robison) – 3:18
 "The Ballad of the Sad Young Men" (Fran Landesman, Tommy Wolf) – 4:23
 "Do Nothing till You Hear from Me" (Duke Ellington, Russell) – 4:08
 "One More Mile" (McFarland, Bobby Paxton) – 2:39
 "Night Bird" – 3:56
 "Up State" (McFarland) – 2:30
 "Señor Blues" (Horace Silver) – 2:45

Personnel 
Anita O'Day – vocals
Bernie Glow, Herb Pomeroy, Doc Severinsen – trumpet
Bob Brookmeyer, Willie Dennis – trombone
Phil Woods, Walter Levinsky – clarinet, alto saxophone
Zoot Sims – tenor saxophone, woodwind
Hank Jones – piano
Barry Galbraith – guitar
George Duvivier – double bass
Mel Lewis – drums
Gary McFarland – arranger, conductor

Production
Sung Lee – art direction, design
Suzanne White – design coordinator
Richard Seidel – executive producer
Dom Cerulli – liner notes
Kevin Reeves – mastering
Pete Turner – photography
Creed Taylor – producer
Rudy Van Gelder – engineer
Tom Greenwood – production assistant
Carlos Kase, Bryan Koniarz, Terri Tierney – production coordination
Ben Young – research, restoration
Jerry Rappaport – supervisor
Deborah Hay – text editor

References

1962 albums
Albums arranged by Gary McFarland
Albums produced by Creed Taylor
Albums recorded at Van Gelder Studio
Anita O'Day albums
Verve Records albums